This page is a list of heirs to the Dutch throne. The list includes all individuals who were considered to inherit the throne of the Netherlands, either as heir apparent or as heir presumptive, since the constitution of the Kingdom of the Netherlands on 16 March 1815. Those who succeeded as King or Queen of the Netherlands are shown in bold. The list also shows who were next in line to the heirs.

See also
List of monarchs of the Netherlands
Lists of rulers in the Low Countries
Prince of Orange
Line of succession to the Dutch throne

References

Dutch monarchy
Netherlands
Netherlands
Heirs to the Dutch throne
Heirs to the Dutch throne